The following human polls make up the 2022 NCAA Division I men's baseball rankings.  The USAToday/ESPN Coaches Poll is voted on by a panel of 31 Division I baseball coaches.  The Baseball America poll is voted on by staff members of the Baseball America magazine. These polls, along with the Perfect Game USA poll, rank the top 25 teams nationally.  Collegiate Baseball and the National Collegiate Baseball Writers Association rank the top 30 teams nationally.

Legend

ESPN/USA Today Coaches Poll

Baseball America

Source:

Collegiate Baseball

The Preseason poll ranked the top 50 teams in the nation.  Teams not listed above are: 31. Nebraska; 32. ; 33. Georgia; 34. Tennessee; 35. ; 36. South Alabama; 37. Liberty; 38. Maryland; 39. UConn; 40. Alabama; 41. ; 42. Oregon State; 43. Arizona State; 44. South Carolina; 45. Oklahoma; 46. ; 47. ; 48. Southern Miss; 49. Old Dominion; 50.

NCBWA 

''The Preseason poll ranked the top 35 teams in the nation.  Teams not listed above are: 31. Southern Miss; 32. Louisiana Tech; 33. UC Santa Barbara; 34. ; 35 Liberty.

D1Baseball

References

Rankings
College baseball rankings in the United States